Foreign ownership refers to the ownership of a portion of a country's assets (businesses, natural resources, property, bonds, equity etc.) by individuals who are not citizens of that country or by companies whose headquarters are not in that country.

Foreign ownership of assets is widespread in a modern, globally integrated economy, at both the corporate and individual levels. An example of the former is when a corporation acquires part, or all, of another company headquartered overseas, or when it purchases property, infrastructure, access rights or other assets in countries abroad. If a multinational corporation acquires at least half of a foreign company, the multinational corporation becomes a holding company, and the company receiving the foreign investment becomes a subsidiary.

At the individual level, foreign ownership occurs whenever a domestic asset is acquired by a foreign individual, such as an Indian businessman buying a house in Hong Kong, or a Russian citizen purchasing United States Treasury bonds.

Benefits
The transfer of technology and organisational knowledge can lead to higher productivity, and the company in the host country can learn from multinational corporations
It increases employment and wages. Inward foreign direct investment has an overall positive effect in employment, as companies have more capital to expand.
It lowers prices and improves the quality of products. That is a result of higher productivity, which is beneficial for consumers and the company's competitiveness for exports.

Drawbacks
Foreign ownership can increase the demand of products, leading to price increases.
The increase in productivity in the firms in foreign ownership can cause other domestic companies to become relatively less competitive, which reduces profits.
Multinational corporations may use their power to influence government policies, especially in underdeveloped countries. That may have an adverse impact on economic development.
A lowering of employment because of operational optimization or an increase by a planned expansion can occur. Wages can be reduced for new employees by new corporate policies, and an optimized employee benefits package can reduce benefits for all. 
The demise of local economies can be caused by siphoning money from communities to global elites.

Policies

Indonesia
The House of Representatives of Indonesia passed the plantation bill to set stricter rules on foreign ownership in the plantation sector to prioritise smaller local plantation firms. There is no specific percentage value on the limit on foreign ownership, but a 30% foreign ownership ceiling had been demanded by the House's Commission IV.

Plantation business groups as well as the Ministry of Agriculture had previously voiced criticism of the bill, expressing concern that it would negatively impact plantation firms and growers, as foreign investment might be reduced.

Even though the bill was passed to limit foreign ownership, the law encourages cooperation research and development between domestic and foreign businesses, universities and individuals.

A reduction in foreign ownership limit may reduce foreign investment, but it can help boost revenue for domestic firms and economic development.

Government Regulation No. 14 of 2018 limited foreign ownership in insurance companies to 80%. However, this rule is not applied retroactively for insurance companies with foreign ownership higher than 80% at the time of its implementation date of 20 January 2020.

Qatar
As part of financial reforms, Qatar's emir has issued a law, allowing foreign investors to obtain up to 49% of listed Qatari companies for expansion in the stock market and to stimulate development in the financial industry.

Prior to the law, ceilings on listed Qatari firms restricted foreign ownership to 25%.

The reform aims to help attract more foreign investment in the long run. However, according to a wealth manager in the Gulf, "It's a step in the right direction, but it will have to be backed up by good performance from companies in order to attract foreign investment. Also, there should be limited impact from the law in the short term due to liquidity issues and limited numbers of shares available."

Russia
In 2014, the Russian Duma passed a law reducing the foreign ownership ceiling for print publications and radio and television outlets from 50% to 20%; it was passed with a vote of 430-2. The legislation, which came into force in 2016, forbids foreign governments, organisations, companies and individuals from founding or holding more than a 20% stake in Russian media businesses.

According to Vadim Dengin, one of the bill's authors, "the tighter limit on foreign ownership would help protect Russia from western influence." However, publishers and editors of independent media companies in Russia argued that the new law would further reduce diversity of opinion.

China 
Land in China is state-owned or collectively owned. Enterprises, farmers, and householders lease land from the state using long-term leases of 20 to 70 years. Foreign investors are not allowed to buy or own land in China.

Thailand 
In Thailand foreigners are prohibited to own or possess land in Thailand.

Cambodia 
Under Article 44 of the Cambodian Constitution, “only natural persons or legal entities of Khmer nationality shall have the right to land ownership.” foreigners are prohibited to own or possess land in Cambodia.

Philippines 
Foreigners are prohibited owning land in the Philippines under the 1987 Constitution.

Indonesia 
Foreigners are not allowed to own freehold land in Indonesia.

Vietnam 
Foreigners cannot buy and own land, like in many other Southeast Asian countries. Instead, the land is collectively owned by all Vietnamese people, but governed by the state. As written in the national Land Law, foreigners and foreign organizations are allowed to lease land. The leasehold period is up to 50 years.

Burma 
Though purchase of land is not permitted to foreigners, a real estate investor may apply for a 70 year leasehold with a Myanmar Investment Commission (MIC) permit.

Belarus 
According to the legislation of Belarus, a foreign citizen cannot own land and only has the right to rent it.

Laos 
As foreigners are prohibited from permanent ownership of land. Foreigners can only lease land for a period of up to 30 year.

Mongolia 
Only Mongolian citizens can own the land within the territory of Mongolia. foreign citizens can only lease the land.

Maldives 
Foreigners are not allowed to own freehold land in Maldives. the land can only be leased to foreigners for 99 years.

Sri Lanka 
In 2014, the Sri Lankan parliament passed a law banning land purchases by foreigners. The new act will allow foreigners to acquire land only on a lease basis of up to 99 years with an annual 15 percent tax on the total rental paid upfront.

Georgia 
Since 2017, A ban on foreigners owning farmland was introduced in the Georgia's new constitution. The new constitution states that, with a small number of exceptions, agricultural land can only be owned by the state, a Georgian citizen or a Georgian-owned entity.

Kazakhstan 
In 2021, President Kassym-Jomart Tokayev signed into law a bill that bans the selling and leasing of agricultural land to foreigners.

Israel 
Approximately 7% of the allocated land in Israel is privately owned. The rest, i.e. 93%, is owned by the State and is known as “Israeli Land”. Israel’s Basic Law on real estate states that Israel’s Land is jointly owned by the State (69%), the Development Authority (12%), and the Jewish National Fund (12%).

See also
Foreign Investment Review Agency (Canada)
Holding company
Subsidiary
Foreign ownership of companies of Canada
Foreign direct investment
Foreign portfolio investment

References

Foreign direct investment
Business ownership